Codename: Asero is a 2008 Philippine television drama science fiction series broadcast by GMA Network. Directed by Mark A. Reyes and Mike Tuviera, it stars Richard Gutierrez in the title role. It premiered on July 14, 2008 on the network's Telebabad line up replacing Joaquin Bordado. The series concluded on November 14, 2008 with a total of 90 episodes. It was replaced by Luna Mystika in its timeslot.

The series is streaming online on YouTube.

Premise
Grecko lives a double life as the Agent Phoenix of The Advocate, a secret agency whose mission is to get rid of lawbreakers in the world. The Advocate's number one opponent, The Empire, aims to destroy them. When The Advocate sends Agent Phoenix on a mission, Grecko decides to meet Emily San Juan in Dubai and the Empire finds out Grecko is Agent Phoenix. The Empire kidnaps Grecko's sister and only agrees to release her if he works for them. He is offered the task to find and deliver a software program called Project: Hercules in exchange for her freedom. Grecko agrees and he goes on an operation that results in him losing his memory and being turned into a cyborg, codenamed Asero.

Cast and characters

Lead cast
 Richard Gutierrez as Grecko Abesamis / Phoenix / Asero

Supporting cast
 Heart Evangelista as Emily San Juan
 Richard Gomez as Ibsen Abesamis / Zeus
 Janno Gibbs as Geron Aguilar / Rock Star
 Michael V. as Bodjie X
 Paolo Contis as Dave Aviejo
 Carmina Villaroel as Lady Q
 Rhian Ramos as Claire Morales
 Ehra Madrigal as Dayze Tagimoro
 Caridad Sanchez as Bertita
 Ramon Christopher as Apollo
 Francine Prieto as Aureana
 Bobby Andrews as Jupiter
 Chynna Ortaleza as Fran Guevarra
 Marky Cielo as Troy Motimor / Beat Box
 Rainier Castillo as Ricky San Juan
 Elvis Gutierrez as Vladimir
 Joanne Quintas as Gelyn Abesamis
 Bubbles Paraiso as Minnie
 Chariz Solomon as Gigi
 Rocky Gutierrez as Felix / Mercury
 Shyr Valdez as Delia San Juan
 Martin delos Santos as Tantam
 Ysa Villar as Perchy
 Jenny Miller as Greta
 Sheree as Malta
 Lovely Rivero as Myra
 Ana Roces as Ellen
 Sandy Talag as Sophie
 Pen Medina as Tagimoro
 Isay Alvarez as Minerva
 Mike Gayoso as Aris
 Jana Roxas as Mia
 Anthony Labrusca as Junie
 Mike Magat as Roboticman

Guest cast
 Schai Sigrist as Pigtails
 Karen delos Reyes as Cleo

Ratings
According to AGB Nielsen Philippines' Mega Manila household television ratings, the pilot episode of Codename: Asero earned a 40.1% rating. While the final episode scored a 32.5% rating.

Accolades

References

External links
 
 

2008 Philippine television series debuts
2008 Philippine television series endings
Filipino-language television shows
GMA Network drama series
Philippine science fiction television series
Television shows filmed in the Philippines
Television shows filmed in the United Arab Emirates